Anders Carlsson (born 18 July 1949) is a Swedish sports shooter. He competed in the mixed skeet event at the 1976 Summer Olympics.

References

External links
 

1949 births
Living people
Swedish male sport shooters
Olympic shooters of Sweden
Shooters at the 1976 Summer Olympics
Sportspeople from Norrköping